Marilina Ross  (born María Celina Parrondo, February 16, 1943, Liniers, Buenos Aires) is an Argentine singer and actress. She went into exile in Spain during the years of the military dictatorship (1976–1983), because this would not allow her to develop her artistic activities in Argentina.

Ex-spouse of actor Emilio Alfaro, she is a friend of the actresses Norma Aleandro, Cristina Banegas, Selva Alemán, singer Piero and writer Alberto Migré. Also, she was a friend of actress Bárbara Mujica, with whom she shared several works.

Discography
 1968: Carta a papá/Vivir aquí
 1974: Estados de ánimo
 1975: Queréme... tengo frío
 1982: Soles
 1983: A mis queridos seres; (reissue Estados de ánimo with Queréme... tengo frío)
 1985: Grandes éxitos en vivo
 1986: Cruzando las grandes aguas
 1987: Mis hijos naturales
 1987: Serie de oro - Marilina for Marilina 
 1989: Conectándome
 1990: Latiendo
 1991: Contra viento y marea
 1991: Cachuso Rantifuso
 1993: De amor y locuras
 2000: Más que un sueño
 2003: Serie de oro - Greatest Hits (Compilation)
 2004: De colección (Compilation)
 2005: Lo mejor de los mejores (Compilation)
 2010: Por arte de magia (CD - DVD)

References

External links
 

1943 births
Actresses from Buenos Aires
Argentine film actresses
Argentine television actresses
Argentine LGBT musicians
Living people
Singers from Buenos Aires
LGBT people in Latin music